The Gallant Pimpernel is a collection of four of The Scarlet Pimpernel novels in a single binding published in 1939.

Contents

Lord Tony's Wife
The Way of the Scarlet Pimpernel
Sir Percy Leads the Band
The Triumph of the Scarlet Pimpernel

Other Pimpernel Collections
The Scarlet Pimpernel etc. 1930 Hodder & Stoughton 
re-released as The Scarlet Pimpernel Omnibus  in 1952
The Scarlet Pimpernel
I Will Repay
Eldorado
Sir Percy Hits Back

References

Novels by Baroness Emma Orczy
Scarlet Pimpernel books
1939 British novels